is a town located in Kamikawa Subprefecture, Hokkaido, Japan.

, the town has an estimated population of 3,202 and a density of five persons per km². The total area is 644.20 km².

Geography 
Shimokawa is 90% forest: primarily oak, white birch, larch, and pine trees.

The main river in Shimokawa is the Nayoro River which is a tributary of the Teshio River (the second longest river in Hokkaido). The Nayoro River has two branches: the Sanru River (smaller) and the Panke River (larger). The Sanru River is very clear and is a spawning area for Cherry Trout. Fly fishing is very popular in Shimokawa.

Climate 
Shimokawa's seasonal snowfall can begin as early as November and continue through to April. Though it is generally shorter than an average summer season, June–August sees temperatures reach as high as 30 °C.

Industry 
Shimokawa was originally a mining town, extracting copper and gold. The mines are now exhausted and the primary industries are lumber and farming.

There are five lumber mills in Shimokawa which produce a total of 60,000 m³ of lumber in a year. The lumber is used both in Japan and exported to Canada, Finland, New Zealand and elsewhere. After an area of the forest is harvested for lumber, it is always replanted with baby trees by the Forestry Union. Sometimes the union invites townspeople to help.

Sports 
Shimokawa has produced many Olympic ski jumpers. For the 2006 Winter Olympics, four ski jumpers who were born in Shimokawa attended (Noriaki Kasai, Takanobu Okabe, Daiki Ito and Kenshiro Ito). Until the 2014 Winter Olympics, Noriaki Kasai has participated seven times. Takanobu Okabe has taken part in four Olympics and got the gold medal at the 1998 Winter Olympics in the team tournament. Daiki Ito has participated thrice. Yuki Ito, Kenshiro Ito and Hiroo Shima have participated once.

Restaurants and cafes 
There are many restaurants in Shimokawa.

Apollo is an Italian café with coffee, pasta, pizza, and other meals.
Morena is an Indian soup-curry restaurant with home-made cake and fruit juices.
Monja is an okonomiyaki restaurant.
Manbō is a made-to-order reservation-only restaurant.
Yanai (矢内菓子舗) is a popular bakery known for its sweet and savory bread, and its Japanese puddings.
You'slu is an izakaya located directly between Yanai and Apollo.

There are also a couple of cafes in the main street such as:
 Be Calm (美花夢カフェ)
 Harukoro (はるころカフェ)

Hot Springs 
Shimokawa has a hot spring called "Gomi Onsen" (五味温泉). It is located approximately a 5-minute car drive away from the city center. The onsen features a carbon dioxide-containing hydrogen carbonate spring that is rare in Japan. The site has indoor and outdoor onsen baths as well as a sauna. The main building has two western-style and 8 traditional-style hotel rooms. An adjacent annex has 7 traditional-style rooms.

Around Gomi Onsen, there is a forest called "Experience Forest" where you can take a walk along the promenade. There are west forest, east forest, and north forest, and you can observe the characteristic trees, scenery, flora, and fauna of each. Other wooden paths and biotopes are available as well.

Schools 
Shimokawa Town has one nursery school, one elementary school, one junior high school, and one commercial high school.

Festivals and events 
Annually, Shimokawa has three main festivals, and several smaller festivals. The three main festivals are as follows:
 Ice Candle Museum: For a week near the end of February, Shimokawa's main park is filled with snow sculptures and decorated with thousands of ice candles. Events are held throughout the week, and kicked off with a large outdoor BBQ party on the first day.
 Udon Festival: The last weekend in August is a two-day festival filled with events such as races, baking contests, and traditional dances. Until 2005 it was called the Homecoming Festival.
 Great Wall Festival: One afternoon in early spring, a large BBQ party with events and carnival-style booths is held in Shimokawa's main park, which contains a small replica of the Great Wall of China.

Below are some of the many other festivals held annually in Shimokawa (in rough order of size):
 Arts Weekend: A weekend of photo and craft exhibitions, concerts, and traditional arts (such as Tea Ceremony).
 Culture Weekend: A weekend where many companies, offices, and factories open their doors to the public for tours.
 Every school has their own sports festival weekend (where the students compete at different sports) and a separate school festival weekend (where the students organize activities and sales for themselves and the townspeople).
 Mikoshi Parade: A Mikoshi (portable shrine) is carried through the town to drive away evil spirits. This is no easy feat, as the shrine weighs over one tonne.
 Marching Band Parade: Held to coincide with Shimokawa's War Memorial Day, marching bands (one from each school) parade through town, led by war veterans.

Mascot

She is a curious yet hard working forest rabbit who spreads good virtues. She wears a headscarf made from wood. She also had wooden ears, a snowy body and a Shimokawa Green-tail. Her birthday is December 1. She is responsible for preserving the Banri No Chojo wall with masonry skills but she also good at making ice candles. When she is on breaks, she usually watches ski jumping (and other events that she loves) and relax at Gomi Onsen. She loves to go to the Shimokawa Forest. She also loves tenobe noodles served with tomato juice and vegetables.

References

External links

 Official Website 

Towns in Hokkaido
Environmental model cities